The 1935 Illinois Fighting Illini football team was an American football team that represented the University of Illinois during the 1935 college football season.  In their 23rd season under head coach Robert Zuppke, the Illini compiled a 3–5 record and finished in a tie for last place in the Big Ten Conference. Guard Ed Gryboski was selected as the team's most valuable player.

On November 9, 1935, Illinois defeated Michigan, 3 to 0, before a homecoming crowd of 28,136 at a rainy Memorial Stadium in Champaign, Illinois. In a low-scoring match, Lowell Spurgeon kicked a 22-yard field goal for Illinois in the second quarter. Michigan's offense was stifled by the Illinois defense. The Wolverines gained only 10 yards of total offense and secured only one first down, that one coming on an Illinois penalty for running into the punter in the third quarter. Michigan threw only two forward passes, with either one or both of them resulting in an interception.

Schedule

References

Illinois
Illinois Fighting Illini football seasons
Illinois Fighting Illini football